Liocarcinus holsatus, sometimes known by the common name flying crab, is a species of swimming crab found chiefly in the North Sea, Irish Sea and English Channel. It is very similar in appearance to the harbour crab Liocarcinus depurator.

The diet of P. holsatus comprises crustaceans, especially juvenile Crangon, molluscs such as Spisula elliptica, and fish. P. holsatus sometimes hosts the parasitic barnacle Sacculina.

References

Portunoidea
Crustaceans of the Atlantic Ocean
Crustaceans described in 1798